Hubba, hubba is a North American informal exclamation used to express approval, excitement, or enthusiasm, especially with regard to a person's appearance.

Hubba may also refer to:

Locations
Hubba Hubba Revue, a burlesque and variety show in San Francisco
Pat's Hubba Hubba, a restaurant in Port Chester, NY
Hubba Hideout, a famous skateboarding spot in San Francisco
 Hubba are native to  Illinois, Wisconsin, and  Sir Lanka

Food
Hubba Bubba, a brand of bubble gum

People
Hubba Hubba, one of the characters from The Hoobs
Hubba, also known as Ubba, a ninth-century Viking

Other
A slang term for crack cocaine
A skateboarding term for a large concrete block used to do tricks on (originating with Hubba Hideout) 
HubbaBubbas, Singaporean band
Hubba, a genus of spiders